Anjelica Bette Fellini (born November 26, 1994) is an American actress known for her role as Rebecca Hoover (Twist) in The Gifted (2018) and as  Blair Wesley in the Netflix teen comedy-drama television series Teenage Bounty Hunters in 2020.

Early life
Fellini was born in New York City where she was raised and currently resides. At an early age Fellini attended ballet school at the Lincoln Center, New York.

Career 
Fellini began her career as a dancer on Broadway.
Her dance instructor first suggested she should take up acting, noting her lively and expressive character; by the age of 20, Fellini was performing on stage in The Phantom of the Opera.

In 2018, Fellini landed her first regular television role in Fox's The Gifted as Rebecca Hoover, also known as Twist, a former mental patient mutant, liberated by the Inner Circle.

In 2020, Fellini was cast in a main role as Blair Wesley in the Netflix teen comedy-drama television series Teenage Bounty Hunters, alongside Maddie Phillips, who plays her twin-sister Sterling, with Blair being the more rebellious sister. The series reached number one on the Netflix Top 10, soon after it was first aired.

The next year, Fellini starred in the Wes Anderson film The French Dispatch, whose cast includes Tilda Swinton, Elisabeth Moss, Bill Murray, Benicio del Toro, Saoirse Ronan, Christoph Waltz and Anjelica Huston.

Personal life
Fellini is Jewish, which she confirmed on a livestream in 2020.

Filmography

Film

Television

Notes

References

External links 
 
 LX Interview with Anjelica Bette Fellini
 

1994 births
American film actresses
21st-century American actresses
American television actresses
Actresses from New York City
Living people